James Lilly Zink (1870 – October 2, 1937) was an athletic director at Indiana University and DePauw University as well as one of the first head coaches of the basketball and football teams at Butler University.

Biography 
Reported to have been from Greencastle, Indiana, Zink was an 1891 graduate of the School of Gymnastics at Vanderbilt University. From 1891 to 1893, he was an instructor in gymnastics and athletics at Indiana University where he held the title of Director of the Men's Gymnasium within the Department of Physical Training. At Indiana, he was a member of the Pi Chapter of the Beta Theta Pi fraternity. Zink was succeeded as IU's Director of the Men's Gymnasium by E.C. Syrett in 1893, then was the Physical Director at the YMCA in Alton, Illinois from 1893 to 1894. In 1895, he was the Director of Athletics at DePauw University.

From 1895 to 1898, Zink was the Director of Physical Culture at Butler College in Irvington, Indiana.  In 1897, Zink took over as the head coach of the university's football team. In his only season at the helm, Butler went undefeated in three games. Zink was also the head coach of the men's basketball team at Butler from 1897 to 1899. Over two seasons, he compiled a record of two victories and five defeats.

After resigning his position in 1899, Zink opened an office in Indianapolis for the practice of "medical gymnastics". In 1902, he advertised himself as a "medical gymnast" specializing in "Hygienic and Corrective Gymnastics, Massage and Hydrotherapy". Zink's was mentioned as a third-party in the appeal of a personal injury case brought before the Indiana Supreme Court in 1910. He was noted in the judgement to be the superintendent of the Zink Gymnasium and Orthopedic Institute. A 1901 issue of American Medicine listed Zink as a "stockholder and subscriber" of the journal.

The United States Patent Office granted Zink a patent for an arch support in 1920 and one for an adjustable hanger for brooms or mops in 1932.

Zink died on October 2, 1937, at St. Vincent's Hospital in Indianapolis.

Head coaching record

Football

Basketball

Notes

References

External links
 

1870 births
1937 deaths
Butler Bulldogs athletic directors
Butler Bulldogs football coaches
Butler Bulldogs men's basketball coaches
DePauw University people
Indiana Hoosiers athletic directors
People from Greencastle, Indiana
People from Johnson County, Missouri
Sportspeople from Indiana
Vanderbilt University alumni